Guy Thys (6 December 1922 – 1 August 2003) was a Belgian football manager, mostly known for being the most successful manager in the history of the Belgium national football team as he managed to lead the national side to their only UEFA European Championship final in 1980 and a fourth–place finish at the 1986 FIFA World Cup.

Career

Thys was born in Antwerp and started his career in the 1940s and 50s as a football player with Beerschot, Daring Molenbeek and Standard. In 1952 and 1953 he played two matches with the Red Devils, the Belgium national team.

He combined the activities of player and trainer for Cercle Brugge from 1954 until 1958. In 1959 he performed the same functions for Racing Lokeren. He became a full-time trainer with Wezel the same year, followed by Herentals, Beveren, Union Sint-Gillis, and Antwerp. Under Thys' leadership Antwerp was a finalist in the Belgian Cup and twice finished second in the championship. Thys was appointed Belgium manager in 1976 and remained in the job until 1989, managing the team for 101 games, 45 of which were victories. Eight months after stepping down as manager Thys was re-appointed in early 1990 in order to take charge of the team for the 1990 World Cup. The side duly qualified through the group stage and was knocked out by the England national team in the second round of the tournament. Thys retired again in 1991.

Under his lead the Red Devils participated twice in the European Championship, and three times at the World Cup. In 1980, Belgium narrowly lost the European Championship final to Germany in Rome. In the opening game of the 1982 World Cup, Belgium surprised the world by beating the reigning world champions Argentina 1–0. In 1986 Belgium finished fourth in the World Cup in Mexico. His team beat Spain and the Soviet Union, but was defeated by Diego Maradona and his Argentine team in the semi-finals.

Death
Guy Thys died on 1 August 2003.

Honours

Player 

 Standard Liège

 Belgian Cup: 1953–54

Player/Manager

Cercle Brugge 

 Belgian Third Division: 1955–56

Manager 

 Beveren

 Belgian Second Division: 1966–67

 Royal Antwerp

 Belgian First Division Runner-up: 1973–74, 1974–75
 Belgian Cup Runner-up: 1974–75

International 
Belgium

 UEFA European Championship: 1980 (runners-up)
 FIFA World Cup: 1986 (fourth place)
 Belgian Sports Merit Award: 1980

Individual 

 World Soccer Magazine Manager of the Year: 1986
 Coach of the Platina 11 (Best Team of 50 Years Golden Shoe Winners): 2003
: From 2011
RBFA 125 Years Icons Team Coach: 2020

References

External links
 
 
 Profile at cerclemuseum.be

1922 births
2003 deaths
Belgian footballers
Belgium international footballers
Belgian football managers
UEFA Euro 1980 managers
1982 FIFA World Cup managers
UEFA Euro 1984 managers
1986 FIFA World Cup managers
1990 FIFA World Cup managers
Footballers from Antwerp
Cercle Brugge K.S.V. players
Royale Union Saint-Gilloise managers
Cercle Brugge K.S.V. managers
Royal Antwerp F.C. managers
K. Beerschot V.A.C. players
Belgian Pro League players
Belgium national football team managers
Association football forwards
R. Daring Club Molenbeek players
Belgian Pro League managers
K.S.K. Beveren managers
K.S.C. Lokeren Oost-Vlaanderen managers